Khoiniki District or Chojnicki Rajon is a district of Gomel Region, in Belarus. Its administrative seat is the town of Khoiniki.

Geography
The district includes the town of Hoiniki, 8 rural councils (Selsovets), and several villages. Following the 1986 Chernobyl disaster, it is partially included in the Polesie State Radioecological Reserve.

Notable residents 
Jazep Haŝkevič (Iosif Goshkevich) (1814, Straličaǔ – 1875), diplomat and Orientalist
Ivan Melezh (1921, Hlinišča – 1976), writer, playwright and publicist
Fyodar Stravinsky (1843, Novy Dvor (Aleksičy) – 1902), opera singer and actor

See also
Chernobyl Nuclear Power Plant

References

External links

 
Districts of Gomel Region
Polesie State Radioecological Reserve